Marasmiellus stenophyllus is a plant pathogen that causes Marasmius sheath and shoot blight on sugarcane.

References

External links 
 Index Fungorum
 USDA ARS Fungal Database

Fungal plant pathogens and diseases
Sugarcane diseases
Marasmiaceae